Emerson Boozer (born July 4, 1943) is a former running back in the American Football League (AFL) and in the National Football League (NFL). In the last year of separate drafts by the AFL and the NFL, Boozer signed with the AFL's New York Jets, rather than with an NFL team.  He played his entire professional career with the Jets. Boozer was a member of the Jets team that defeated the NFL's champion Baltimore Colts, 16–7, in Super Bowl III.  Before joining the American Football League, Boozer played college football at the Maryland State College, which is now the University of Maryland Eastern Shore.

Early life
Boozer's natural athletic ability came to the attention of football coaches at Lucy Craft Laney High School in Augusta, Georgia. Despite his proven talent there, football scholarships were not widely offered to the black star. Boozer excelled as well at the college level, where he showed open field ability as a back as well as strength and intensity as a player that exceeded his 5'11 190-pound size.

Boozer played for Maryland State College from 1962 to 1965.  A two-time All-American, Boozer rushed for a school-record 2,537 yards and 22 touchdowns on 374 carries, an average of 6.8 yards per rush.

Professional career
Not widely sought by the NFL, Boozer was drafted by the Jets, who were assembling a team of talented and enthusiastic players under George Sauer and Wilbur "Weeb" Ewbank. The team already had fullback Matt Snell and figured Boozer to be paired with him at halfback. Sharing the job with Bill Mathis as a rookie, Boozer worked hard and became a starter in 1967. His ability to block with intensity earned him a league-wide reputation.

In 1967, with Snell injured, the Jets turned to Boozer as a rusher. In the first half of that season, Boozer displayed talent that drew comparisons to Gale Sayers. He often broke tackles and excelled in the open field. He had ten touchdowns by mid-season and appeared ready to easily surpass the league record, but then suffered a devastating knee injury against the Kansas City Chiefs that completely altered his career. Despite playing just half that year, he still led the AFL in rushing touchdowns for the season.

Boozer's work ethic further revealed itself over the next two seasons. No longer a breakaway runner, he changed himself into more of an outstanding blocker and goal-line touchdown scorer. Ewbank utilized Boozer in pass blocking schemes then new to football. In blocking for both Snell and Joe Namath, Boozer was part of two outstanding teams that narrowly lost just three games in 1968 and went 10–4 in 1969. Boozer and Winston Hill were the blockers during Snell's famous touchdown run against the Baltimore Colts in Super Bowl III. Boozer's blocking freed Snell often that day for effective running that was key to the legendary 16–7 win.

Namath turned to Boozer more as a third-down pass catcher in 1970. In 1971, with Snell down again, Boozer took up the slack with a career-high in carries.

In 1972, with Joe Namath back from injuries himself, the Jets were one of the top offenses in football. Boozer's ability to block and score near the goal line impressed many as he led the NFL in rushing touchdowns for most of the year before injuries stopped him with 11 touchdowns in 11 games.

In 1973, he was again the main back with 831 yards rushing before taking a spot next to John Riggins in 1974. Boozer scored the first regular-season overtime ("sudden death") touchdown in NFL history on a short pass from Joe Namath in 1974 to beat the cross-town rival New York Giants, beginning an improbable six-game winning streak for the previously 1–7 Jet squad.

Boozer was a player who made the most of limited opportunities early on. When injury robbed him of stardom, he reinvented himself and still had a remarkable career as a key contributor to a set of famous Jets teams.

Boozer is a member of The Pigskin Club Of Washington, D.C. National Intercollegiate All-American Football Players Honor Roll. In 2010, he was inducted into the College Football Hall of Fame. The Jets inducted him into their Ring of Honor in 2015. He was inducted into the Suffolk Sports Hall of Fame on Long Island in the Football Category with the Class of 1996.

In popular culture
In the 1999 movie Big Daddy, Adam Sandler is wearing Boozer's New York Jets #32 jersey at the bar
.

See also
List of American Football League players

References

External links
Georgia Sports Hall of Fame
Suffolk Sports Hall of Fame
Friday Nights, Emerson Boozer, and Me

1943 births
African-American players of American football
Living people
Players of American football from Augusta, Georgia
American football running backs
New York Jets players
American Football League All-Star players
Maryland Eastern Shore Hawks football players
National Football League announcers
College Football Hall of Fame inductees
American Football League players
21st-century African-American people
20th-century African-American sportspeople